Ram Gopal Varma Ki Aag, or simply, Aag  is a 2007 Indian Hindi-language action drama film produced and directed by Ram Gopal Varma, the film features Amitabh Bachchan, Mohanlal, Ajay Devgn, Prashant Raj Sachdev, Sushmita Sen, J. D. Chakravarthy, and Suchitra Krishnamoorthi in principal roles. The film is an adaptation of the 1975 Hindi film Sholay, upon release, it was negatively received by the critics. It is considered as one of the worst films made.

Plot
Nashik-based Heerendra Dhaan and Raj Ranade are bodyguards of a politician but, after their employer is implicated in a scam, they end up assaulting a police officer and flee to Mumbai. Once there, they meet with Rambhabhai, who, in turn, gets them employed with a gangster named Shambhu. After a short, while the duo is apprehended by Police Inspector Narsimha, questioned, and after they agree to cooperate to bring down Shambhu, they will be let go. The two succeed in assisting the police arrest Shambhu, but they themselves are arrested, tried in Court, and sentenced to a year in jail.

After their discharge, they are again met by Inspector Narsimha, who, this time, wants to recruit them to capture and kill dreaded bandit Babban Singh, who had slaughtered his wife, Kavita, and son, Subbu, as well as cut his fingers off. He had done this as revenge for killing his brother, whom he really loved, and for having him sent to jail. Heerendra and Raj agree to carry out this task for 8 Lakh Rupees. They re-locate to Kaliganj, where Heerendra falls in love with an auto-rickshaw driver, Ghungroo, while Raj gives his heart to Subbu's widow, Durga. They then set out to capture Babban and meet with some success during Diwali, but Babban manages to escape. Babban then starts to ambush and kill the Kaliganj residents to compel them to surrender the duo to him.

Raj and Heerendra give in and meet Babban's henchmen in an abandoned building. They fight the goons, but Raj is killed in the process. Babban's right-hand man, Tambe, is badly injured, and later on, killed by Babban for failing. Babban has a final encounter with Heerendra and Inspector Narsimha, where Heerendra was about to kill him, but Inspector Narsimha tells him to spare and let the law decide his fate. However, Babban tries to escape, and he's shot dead (it is unclear as to who shot him since Heerendra was told not to kill him and Inspector Narsimha does not have fingers). The film ends with Heerendra getting arrested and Inspector Narsimha apologizing to everyone about it.

Cast
Amitabh Bachchan as Babban Singh
Mohanlal as Police Inspector Narsimha
Ajay Devgn as Heerendra 'Heero' Chavan
Prashant Raj Sachdev as Raj Ranade
Sushmita Sen as Durga Devi
Sushant Singh as Tambe
Priyanka Kothari as Ghungroo
Rajpal Yadav as Rambhabhai
Malkeet Singh as Ghasti Sharma
Suchitra Krishnamoorthi as Kavita
J. D. Chakravarthy as Subbu
Ravi Kale as Pradhan
D. Santosh as Coolie
Jeeva as Dhaania
Abhishek Bachchan as Gypsy Singer (Special Appearance)
Urmila Matondkar as Gypsy Dancer (Special Appearance)

Soundtrack 
Music director:
Ganesh Hegde, Nitin Raikwar

Copyright infringement suit
The Delhi High Court fined Ram Gopal Varma  for the "deliberate act" of copyright infringement for the usage of characters such as "Gabbar Singh" of original Sholay.

Reception
This film received negative reviews from critics and also turned out to be a commercial failure. Rajeev Masand rated it zero out of five. The Times of India stated that Aag "destroyed Bollywood's greatest film" and acknowledged that some "consider it the world's worst film."  Hindustan Times awarded it the "Lifetime's Worst Ever Movie Award."  It came in first in a FHM India list of the 57 worst movies ever made.  Total Film included it in their list of the 66 worst films of all time. Amitabh Bachchan later admitted that the film was "a mistake."

See also
 List of films considered the worst

References

External links
 

2007 films
2000s Hindi-language films
Remakes of Indian films
2007 action drama films
Films directed by Ram Gopal Varma
Indian action drama films
Films with screenplays by Salim–Javed
Sholay
2000s masala films
Hindi-language action films